The 1954 World Table Tennis Championships men's singles was the 21st edition of the men's singles championship. 

Ichiro Ogimura defeated Tage Flisberg in the final, winning three sets to one to secure the title.

Results

+ Time limit rules applies

See also
List of World Table Tennis Championships medalists

References

-